Alfonso Gómez is a Mexican boxer.

Alfonso Gómez may also refer to:

Alfonso Gómez-Lobo (1940–2011), professor of metaphysics
Alfonso Gómez Méndez (born 1949), politician
Alfonso Gomez-Rejon, television and film director